Treenuch Thienthong is a Thai politician. , she serves as Minister of Education in the second cabinet of Prime Minister Prayut Chan-o-cha. She is the first woman to serve as Minister of Education of Thailand.

Early life and education 
Treenuch was born on 12 September 1972 in Watthana Nakhon District, Sa Kaeo Province (When it was still part of Prachinburi Province at that time). She is the granddaughter of Sanoh Thienthong, supporting actor in the rise to premiership of many Prime Minister. 

Treenuch has a Bachelor of Business in Finance and Master of Arts in Economics from Western Illinois University, United States.

Political careers 
Treenuch was elected a member of the House of Representatives of Sa Kaeo Province for the first time and the second time in the 2001 Thai general election under the Thai Rak Thai Party. She having been elected 4 times, the last time under the Pheu Thai Party. In 2018, she moved to work with Palang Pracharath Party and in the 2019 Thai general election she was elected for a fifth term.

On 22 March 2021, She hold the position of Minister of Education which was the first female politician to be elected to this position.

Personal life 
Treenuch married Dr. Jesada Chokdamrongsuk, former Permanent-Secretary of the Ministry of Public Health.

References 

Living people
1972 births
Place of birth missing (living people)
Trinuch Thienthong
Trinuch Thienthong
Trinuch Thienthong
Trinuch Thienthong
Western Illinois University alumni
Trinuch Thienthong
Trinuch Thienthong